Patrik Anderbro (born 8 March 1973) is a Swedish former bandy player who most recently played for Västerås SK as a midfielder or forward. Anderbro was a youth product of IFK Eskilstuna.

References

External links 
 Patrik Anderbro at bandysidan

Swedish bandy players
Living people
1973 births
Falu BS players
Västerås SK Bandy players